Cassidy Mill, in Mora County, New Mexico near Cleveland, New Mexico, was built in 1877.  It is located southeast of Cleveland on New Mexico State Road 3 and was listed on the National Register of Historic Places in 1978.

It is a three-story adobe building, built upon a basement walls and stone foundations.  It was equipped with a set of French buhrstones, and was built by Joseph Fuss. It was documented by the Historic American Engineering Record (HAER) in May, 1978.

See also
St. Vrain's Mill, at Mora, also NRHP-listed

References

		
National Register of Historic Places in Mora County, New Mexico
Buildings and structures completed in 1877
1877 establishments in New Mexico Territory